Riddick House is a historic plantation house located near Como, Hertford County, North Carolina. It is dated to about 1795, and is a three-story, five bay, "L"-shaped Federal style frame dwelling with a two-story Greek Revival style rear addition. It is sheathed in weatherboard, sits on a brick foundation, and has two double-shouldered brick chimneys on each gable end.

It was listed on the National Register of Historic Places in 1971.

References

Plantation houses in North Carolina
Houses on the National Register of Historic Places in North Carolina
Federal architecture in North Carolina
Greek Revival houses in North Carolina
Houses completed in 1825
Houses in Hertford County, North Carolina
National Register of Historic Places in Hertford County, North Carolina